Mala Vas pri Ormožu is a settlement in the Slovene Hills in the Municipality of Sveti Tomaž in northeastern Slovenia. The area traditionally belonged to the Styria region and is now included in the Drava Statistical Region.

References

External links
Mala Vas pri Ormožu on Geopedia

Populated places in the Municipality of Sveti Tomaž